"L.I.L.Y." (stands for Like I Love You) is the second single of Kate Ryan's 4th album Free. This single was first presented in the Alive concert which was on 6 October 2007 in the Lotto Arena in Antwerp.
A video for the song was shot in Berlin during January, directed by Peter Van Eyndt.
It was only released in Belgium, Bulgaria and Poland.

Track listing
 CD Single
"L.I.L.Y." (Album Version) - 3:15
"L.I.L.Y." (Extended Version) - 6:02

Official versions
Album Version - 3:15
Extended Version - 6:07

Chart performance

References

External links

Kate Ryan songs
2008 singles
2007 songs
Songs written by Jeanette Olsson
Songs written by Niklas Bergwall
Songs written by Jim Dyke
Songs written by Niclas Kings